Jason George (born May 21, 2001) is a German professional basketball player for Bayern Munich, currently playing on loan at Niners Chemnitz of the Basketball Bundesliga. He plays as a swingman. George represented the German national basketball team during the 2016 FIBA U16 European Championship and the 2017 FIBA U18 European Championship.

References

External links
basketball.realgm.com profile
EuroLeague profile
FC Bayern Munich profile
EuroBasket profile
FIBA U20 European Challengers profile

2001 births
Living people
FC Bayern Munich basketball players
German men's basketball players
Small forwards